Dotan Harpenau (born 26 October 1986), better known by his stage name Dotan, is a Dutch-Israeli singer-songwriter, multi-instrumentalist, and record producer.

Biography

Personal life
Dotan was born in Jerusalem and moved to Amsterdam at the age of one.

2014–2015: 7 Layers
On 31 January 2014, Dotan released his self-produced studio album 7 Layers at Paradiso, Amsterdam. The album quickly reached number 2 on the Dutch Top 100 Charts according to Dutch news website NU.nl.

The first single, "Fall", was released on 17 January 2014. The second single, "Home", was nominated SuperCrazyTurboTopHit, 3FM Megahit, and Alarmschijf on Dutch Radio.

After several weeks at number one in the Dutch iTunes top 100, "Home" entered the Dutch MegaTop50 at number 1 and remained there for 4 weeks. "Home" also became number 1 in Belgium on 22 August. It peaked at number 9 on the German iTunes top 100.

The album 7 Layers achieved Gold status on 25 August, and "Home" reached Double Platinum status. It also went Gold in Belgium.
The album reached Double Platinum on 15 October 2015 in the Netherlands, and "Home" achieved Triple Platinum status on 23 December 2014. The single also reached number 2 on the Next Big Sound chart on the American entertainment website Billboard.

The record is in the top five most streamed albums in the Netherlands on Spotify and number 10 in the Top 1,000 best albums in the Netherlands of all time.

The song "Hungry" reached number 2 on the annual list of 2015 on Belgium's radio station Studio Brussel.

In 2015 and 2016, Dotan toured across the United States twice with Ben Folds.

2016–present: "Shadow Wind" and Numb
In January 2016, Dotan launched his own concert series, titled 7 Layers Sessions, at Bitterzoet, Amsterdam, where he promotes talented new national and international musicians.
After some sold-out sessions at Bitterzoet, 7 Layers also added a festival edition in 2016. Dotan announced a second season in 2017.

Dotan released his single "Shadow Wind" on 4 August 2016, and this was chosen as the 2016 Olympic Games anthem. "Shadow Wind" was nominated as a 3FM Megahit as well as a 538 Alarmschijf and Radio 2 Topsong in the Netherlands, and peaked on the airplay chart at number one. After several sold-out tours through Europe, Dotan sold out the music stadium Ziggo Dome in Amsterdam in 2018.

On 22 May 2020, Dotan released the EP Numb.

Controversy
In April 2018, after several months of research, Dutch newspaper de Volkskrant revealed that Dotan had enlisted the aid of at least 140 troll accounts to boost his online reputation and following. These accounts disparaged other musicians and made up feel-good stories about chance encounters with fans. de Volkskrant also revealed that Dotan's management had repeatedly tried to alter Dotan's Dutch Wikipedia page. The singer later confirmed the existence of these accounts, apologised, and temporarily halted all his social media activities.

Discography

Albums

EPs
 Numb (2020)

Singles
As main artist

As featured artist

Notes

References

External links
 

1986 births
Living people
Dutch male singer-songwriters
Dutch gay musicians
Dutch multi-instrumentalists
Dutch LGBT singers
Dutch LGBT songwriters
Gay singers
Gay songwriters
Dutch rock guitarists
Dutch male guitarists
Dutch rock pianists
Jewish Dutch musicians
Dutch people of Israeli descent
Israeli emigrants to the Netherlands
Israeli male singer-songwriters
Israeli gay musicians
Israeli LGBT singers
Israeli LGBT songwriters
Musicians from Jerusalem
Musicians from Amsterdam
Male pianists
Universal Music Group artists
Grönland Records artists
21st-century LGBT people